Brachyponera is genus of ants in the subfamily Ponerinae.

Distribution
The genus is natively distributed from Africa to southern Asia and Australia, with most species occurring in Southeast Asia. At least two species are invasive in other parts of the world. B. chinensis, the most studied Brachyponera species, has been introduced as an exotic ant in southeastern United States and New Zealand. The other invasive species, B. sennaarensis, is spreading through the Middle East.

Description
The genus was first established as a subgenus of Euponera, when Emery (1900) described B. croceicornis. Workers are small to medium in size (3–7 mm) and have triangular mandibles. Queens are similar to workers, but larger and winged.

Species

Brachyponera arcuata (Karavaiev, 1925)
Brachyponera atrata (Karavaiev, 1925)
Brachyponera batak (Yamane, 2007)
Brachyponera brevidorsa Xu, 1994
Brachyponera chinensis (Emery, 1895)
Brachyponera christmasi (Donisthorpe, 1935)
Brachyponera croceicornis (Emery, 1900)
Brachyponera flavipes (Yamane, 2007)
Brachyponera jerdonii (Forel, 1900)
Brachyponera lutea (Mayr, 1862)
Brachyponera luteipes (Mayr, 1862)
Brachyponera mesoponeroides Radchenko, 1993
Brachyponera nakasujii (Yashiro, Matsuura, Guénard, Terayama & Dunn, 2010)
Brachyponera nigrita (Emery, 1895)
Brachyponera obscurans (Walker, 1859)
Brachyponera pilidorsalis (Yamane, 2007)
Brachyponera sennaarensis (Mayr, 1862)
Brachyponera tianzun (Terayama, 2009)
Brachyponera wallacei (Yamane, 2007)

References

External links

Ponerinae
Ant genera